Clara Mackintosh is the younger sister of title character Johnny Mackintosh in the series of books by English novelist Keith Mansfield, published by Quercus Books.

Clara appears early in Johnny Mackintosh and the Spirit of London, the first book of the series, as a pupil at the Proteus Institute for the Gifted (located near the fictional town of Yarnton Hill in southwest England). Johnny finds her and together they leave Earth in a space elevator and their adventures begin.

Clara is portrayed as having blonde hair, blue eyes (inlaid with silver flecks) and pale skin, unblemished apart from a pattern of seven freckles on the inside of her left shin in the shape of the constellation the Plough (her 'Starmark'). In the books she is described as ‘Owlein’, meaning she has the extremely rare ability to ‘fold’ space. She lives aboard the spaceship the Spirit of London, from the outside a carbon copy of the skyscraper known as the London Gherkin.

References 

Mackintosh